Cherry Valley Creek is a  headwater tributary of the Susquehanna River in central New York, United States.

Cherry Valley Creek flows southwesterly through the Cherry Valley in Otsego County, making its way through the towns of Cherry Valley, Roseboom, and Middlefield before joining the Susquehanna River east of the village of Milford.

See also
List of rivers of New York

References

Rivers of New York (state)
Rivers of Otsego County, New York